Two human polls comprised the 1950 National Collegiate Athletic Association (NCAA) football rankings. Unlike most sports, college football's governing body, the NCAA, does not bestow a national championship, instead that title is bestowed by one or more different polling agencies. There are two main weekly polls that begin in the preseason—the AP Poll and the Coaches Poll.

Legend

AP Poll
This was the first season that the AP released a preseason poll before any games were played in August. The final AP Poll was released on November 27, near the end of the 1950 regular season, weeks before the major bowls. The AP would not release a post-bowl season final poll regularly until 1968.

Coaches Poll
This was the first year for the UP Coaches Poll, and its final edition was released prior to the bowl games, on 
Oklahoma received 32 of the 35 first-place votes, with one vote each to Princeton, Michigan State,

References

College football rankings